AlRiyadiya   is a Saudi sports network sport channel.

References

External links

https://arabia.eurosport.com/article/أخبار-السعودية/أخبار-السعودية/هوية-جديدة-للقنوات-الرياضية-السعودية

2002 establishments in Saudi Arabia
Television channels and stations established in 2002
Mass media in Riyadh
Television stations in Saudi Arabia